The final of the Women's Hammer Throw event at the 1998 European Championships in Budapest, Hungary was held on Saturday August 22, 1998. There were a total number of 35 participating athletes. The qualifying rounds were staged a day earlier, on Friday August 21, with the mark set at 61.50 metres. It was the first time in history that women competed in the hammer throw at the European Championships.

Medalists

Abbreviations
All results shown are in metres

Records

Qualification

Final ranking

Final

See also
 1998 Hammer Throw Year Ranking

Notes

References
 Results
 todor66
 hammerthrow.wz

Hammer throw
Hammer throw at the European Athletics Championships
1998 in women's athletics